Antonivka is an urban-type settlement in Kherson Raion, Kherson Oblast, southern Ukraine. It is a northeastern suburb of Kherson and is located on the right bank of the Dnieper. Antonivka belongs to Kherson urban hromada, one of the hromadas of Ukraine. It has a population of

Administrative status 
Until 18 July, 2020, Antonivka belonged to Kherson Municipality. The municipality as an administrative unit was abolished in July 2020 as part of the administrative reform of Ukraine, which reduced the number of raions of Kherson Oblast to five. The area of Kherson Municipality was merged into Kherson Raion.

Economy

Transportation
Antonivka railway station is adjacent to the settlement. It is on the railway which used to connect Kherson with Dzhankoi; however, after the Russian annexation of Crimea in 2014, the trains only run as far as Vadim, close to the border with Crimea. There is infrequent passenger traffic.

The settlement is built in the road network of Kherson. In particular, it has access to Highway M17, which runs to the border with Crimea and Highway M14, which connects Kherson and Melitopol.

See also 

 Russian occupation of Kherson Oblast

References

Urban-type settlements in Kherson Raion
Populated places on the Dnieper in Ukraine